Standing at the Sky's Edge is a musical with music and lyrics by Richard Hawley and a book by Chris Bush.

The musical (named after Hawley's 2012 album of the same name) begins in 1961 and tells the story of three families over sixty years living in Park Hill, a council housing estate in Sheffield and features both new and existing songs by Hawley.

Production history

World premiere: Sheffield (2019) 
The musical premiered at the Crucible Theatre, Sheffield previewing from 14 March (with a press night on 20 March) running until 6 April 2019. The production was directed by artistic director Robert Hastie, designed by Ben Stones and choreographed by Lynne Page. The cast featured Darragh Cowley, Nicole Deon, Louis Gaunt, Adam Hugill, Robert Lonsdale, Fela Lufadeju, Maimuna Memon, Johanne Murdock, Damian Myerscough, Alastair Natkiel, Faith Omole, Deborah Tracey, Rachael Wooding and Alex Young.

Sheffield revival and London (2022-23) 
Following the success of the 2019 production, the musical was revived at the Crucible Theatre, Sheffield from 10 December 2022 to 21 January 2023, before transferring to the Olivier Theatre at the National Theatre, London from 9 February to 25 March 2023. The revival was due to take place in 2020-21 but was delayed due to the COVID-19 pandemic.

A National Theatre co-production with Sheffield Theatres opened at the Olivier Theatre, London, on 9th February 2023 to favourable critical reaction.

Roles and principal casts

Awards and nominations

2019 Sheffield production

2023 London production
The show received eight nominations for the 2023 Olivier Awards, making it the most nominated musical of the season.

Cast Recording 
The Original Live Cast Recording was recorded over three evenings in December 2022 during the Sheffield revival and mixed at the Arch Studios, Sheffield. The recording was released on 13 February 2023 and features 17 songs.

Adaptations 
In February 2023 it was announced that the show would be adapted by StudioCanal’s RED Production Company into a four-part television series.

References 
8 Story on the Graffiti https://www.bbc.co.uk/programmes/b01302s4
2019 musicals
British musicals
Plays set in England